Richard Neil Peter Tait (born 2 December 1989) is a Scottish professional footballer who plays as a full-back for Scottish Premiership club St Mirren.

Playing career

Early years
Born in Galashiels, Tait began his career with Ashton-under-Lyne side Curzon Ashton. In January 2008, Tait was signed on a youth contract by Nottingham Forest. On 28 March 2009, Tait joined Conference North side Tamworth on loan. At the end of the 2008–09 Tait was released by Forest.

Tamworth
Tait was snapped up by Conference North side Tamworth following the successful loan. He appeared regularly for the side, and helped Tamworth gain promotion from the Conference North as champions in the 2008–09 season.

He signed a new deal in February 2012.

Cambridge United
On 8 May 2013 Tait joined Cambridge United. He appeared in 35 league matches during the season, helping the club return to League Two, being a part of the team that won promotion by winning the 2014 Conference Premier play-off Final. On 8 August 2014 Tait played in Cambridge's first match back in League Two, starting in a 1–0 home win against Plymouth Argyle. At the end of the 2014–15 season the club did not offer him a new deal when his contract expired.

Grimsby Town
On 30 June 2015, Tait signed for Conference National side Grimsby Town.

Tait played in Grimsby's 3–1 victory over Forest Green Rovers in the 2016 National League play-off Final at Wembley, seeing Grimsby promoted to League Two after a six-year absence from the Football League.

Motherwell
On 23 June 2016, Tait signed for Scottish Premiership club Motherwell, agreeing a three-year contract. He scored his first goal for Motherwell on 29 October 2016, in a 4–1 win over Ross County.
In his last season at Motherwell he helped the Steelmen finish third in the Scottish Premiership which got them into the Europa League qualifiers.

St. Mirren
On 18 June 2020, Tait signed for Scottish Premiership club St. Mirren, on a two-year deal.

Career statistics

Honours

Club
Tamworth
Conference North: 2008–09

Cambridge United
Conference Premier play-offs: 2014
FA Trophy: 2013–14

Grimsby Town
National League play-offs: 2016
FA Trophy runner-up: 2015–16

References

External links

1989 births
Living people
People from Galashiels
Scottish footballers
Association football defenders
Curzon Ashton F.C. players
Nottingham Forest F.C. players
Tamworth F.C. players
Cambridge United F.C. players
English Football League players
National League (English football) players
Grimsby Town F.C. players
Motherwell F.C. players
St Mirren F.C. players
Scottish Professional Football League players